Christopher Anthony Arthur Hancock (5 June 1928 – 29 September 2004) was a British television and theatre actor. He was born in Bishop Auckland, County Durham, England. His brother was actor Stephen Hancock. He and his brother trained at the Bristol Old Vic Theatre School. He was married to Ann Walford; the couple had two daughters before divorcing.

Hancock began acting in the theatre in the 1960s and he had roles in plays such as Richard II and Measure for Measure (both 1965) and the musical Billy (Theatre Royal, Drury Lane, 1974).

He was then best known for playing conman Charlie Cotton in the popular BBC soap opera EastEnders from 1986 until 1990. His character was killed off in July 1991 but his death was not shown on-screen. He also appeared in other television series such as Z-Cars, Softly, Softly, The Gaffer, The Upper Hand and The Bill.

He reprised his EastEnders role as Charlie Cotton briefly in a special spin-off episode titled Return of Nick Cotton where he appeared as Charlie's ghost in October 2000. He died on 29 September 2004 of a heart attack at the age of 76 in Lincolnshire.

Selected filmography

The Six Wives of Henry VIII (1970) .... Sir Henry Norreys
Elizabeth R (1971) .... Idiaquez
Casanova (1971) .... Cicospetto
Z-Cars (1971) .... Fraser / (1977) .... Dr. Villiers
Softly, Softly (1972) .... Meadows
Crown Court (1974)
Love for Lydia (1977) ....  Mr Richardson
Cribb (1980) .... Mr Strathamore
The Gaffer (1981–1982) .... Wagstaff
EastEnders (1986–1990) .... Charlie Cotton
Little Dorrit (1988) .... Customer at Coffee House
The Mirror Crack'd (1992) .... Arthur Badcock
Casualty  (1993) .... Ted Springett
The Upper Hand (1993) .... Mr. Tanner
The Bill (2 episodes, 1993–1994) as Ivor Thomas (1993) /  Mr. Clarke (1994)
Return of Nick Cotton (2000) .... Charlie Cotton

References

External links

Christopher Hancock Obituary

1928 births
2004 deaths
English male soap opera actors
Actors from County Durham